The 1860 New York state election was held on November 6, 1860, to elect the governor, the lieutenant governor, a Canal Commissioner, and an Inspector of State Prisons, as well as all members of the New York State Assembly. Besides, the question of Negro suffrage was asked, and was answered in the negative with 197,503 votes for and 337,984 against it.

History
William Kelly was the candidate of the majority faction of the Democratic Party which supported Stephen A. Douglas for President.

The "Breckinridge and Lane Democratic" state convention met on August 8 at Syracuse, New York, Henry S. Randall presided. James T. Brady (a Tammany man from New York City who had run for Attorney General on the Hard ticket in 1853) was nominated for Governor on the first ballot (vote:Brady 99, O'Connor 8, Greene C. Bronson 3, Brown 2, Lawrence 1, Kemble 1, Gideon J. Tucker 1). Henry K. Viele was nominated on the first ballot (vote: Viele 57, Edward Tompkins 56). The incumbent John M. Jaycox was re-nominated for Canal Commissioner by acclamation. Robert W. Allen was nominated for Prison Inspector on the first ballot. After the nominations, Daniel S. Dickinson made a speech. Brady accepted the nomination in a letter dated on August 14.

Result
The whole Republican ticket was elected, an average of about 50,000 votes ahead of the combined Democratic vote. The incumbents Morgan and Campbell were re-elected. The incumbents Jaycox and Rhodes were defeated.

93 Republicans and 35 Democrats were elected for the session of 1861 to the New York State Assembly.

See also
New York gubernatorial elections
New York black suffrage referendum, 1860

Notes

Sources
Result in The Tribune Almanac 1861
Result in The Official State Canvass in NYT on December 10, 1860 (gives 367,958 for Barnes, which seems to be a typo)
The tickets: THE ELECTION TO-MORROW in NYT on November 5, 1860

1860
 
New York
November 1860 events